The Adventures of Rocky and Bullwinkle is a 2000 American live-action/animated adventure slapstick comedy film directed by Des McAnuff and produced by Universal Pictures, based on the television cartoon of the same name by Jay Ward. Animated characters Rocky and Bullwinkle share the screen with live actors portraying Fearless Leader (Robert De Niro, who also co-produced the film), Boris Badenov (Jason Alexander) and Natasha Fatale (Rene Russo) along with Randy Quaid, Piper Perabo, Kenan Thompson and Kel Mitchell. June Foray reprised her role as Rocky, while Keith Scott (no relation to original voice actor Bill Scott) voiced Bullwinkle and the film's narrator. It also features cameo appearances by performers including James Rebhorn, Paget Brewster, Janeane Garofalo, John Goodman, David Alan Grier, Don Novello, Jon Polito, Carl Reiner, Whoopi Goldberg, Max Grodenchik, Norman Lloyd, Jonathan Winters and Billy Crystal. The film follows a young rookie FBI agent named Karen Sympathy enlisting the help of Rocky and Bullwinkle to stop Boris, Natasha, and Fearless Leader from taking over the United States.

Released on June 30, 2000, the film was a box office bomb, grossing $35.1 million worldwide against its $76 million budget (making it one of the biggest box office bombs in history) and received generally negative reviews with criticisms toward its writing, plot, and humor while praising the performances, visual effects, and faithfulness to its source material.

Plot
Rocky the Squirrel and Bullwinkle J. Moose live a melancholic life ever since their television series was cancelled in 1964. Their animated home, Frostbite Falls, is deforested, Rocky can no longer fly, and their show's unseen Narrator lives with his mother. Meanwhile, their archenemies, Fearless Leader, Boris Badenov, and Natasha Fatale, have all lost power in Pottsylvania following the end of the Cold War. They escape by tunneling to a Hollywood film studio, where they trick executive Minnie Mogul into signing a rights contract to their series and green-lighting a potential movie, dragging the villains out of the animated world and transforming them into live action characters.
 
Six months later, Fearless Leader and his minions have founded RBTV ("Really Bad Television"), a cable television network in New York City that is programmed to control the population by brainwashing American audiences into voting Fearless Leader in as the next President of the United States. FBI Director, Cappy von Trapment, deploys agent Karen Sympathy to recruit Rocky and Bullwinkle to stop RBTV's intended broadcast. Karen travels to a movie-generating lighthouse in Los Angeles, summoning Rocky, Bullwinkle, and the Narrator into the real world. 
 
Upon learning of Rocky and Bullwinkle's return, Fearless Leader deploys Boris and Natasha to destroy them. They are given the CDI ("Computer-Degenerating Imagery"), a laptop-like weapon that can trap cartoon characters within the Internet. The villains' truck is stolen by Karen, who is swiftly arrested by Oklahoma State Police troopers when Natasha poses as her. Boris and Natasha later steal a helicopter to continue their pursuit. Karen is sent to prison but manipulates a love-struck Swedish guard named Ole to help her escape. Rocky and Bullwinkle are picked up by students Martin and Lewis, who attends Bullwinkle's alma mater Wossamotta U. Boris and Natasha launch an elaborate plan to assassinate Bullwinkle, donating a cheque to the university in his name, inspiring the academic board to award Bullwinkle with an honorary "Mooster's Degree". As Bullwinkle addresses the students, Rocky regains his ability to fly, stopping Boris from killing Bullwinkle with the CDI.
 
Boris and Natasha chase Rocky and Bullwinkle through Chicago, but disintegrate their own helicopter. Karen reunites with Rocky and Bullwinkle, but the trio is arrested again by numerous state troopers. They are trialed for numerous misdemeanors in ten states, but the presiding Judge Cameo has the charges dropped upon recognizing Rocky and Bullwinkle, informing the district attorney that celebrities are above the law. The trio buys a rickety biplane and escapes Boris and Natasha once again. The two villains consider retiring, lying to Fearless Leader that they had defeated Rocky and Bullwinkle, confident that they have already won. Meanwhile, the heroes' plane begins to lose altitude due to the combined weight. Rocky flies Karen to New York to stop the broadcast, but they are captured by Boris and Natasha. Fearless Leader initiates his plan and broadcasts programs to brainwash most of the country.
 
Bullwinkle crash-lands the plane outside the White House in Washington, D.C., and finds the President to be brainwashed by the RBTV programs, which Bullwinkle is immune due to his natural stupidity. Cappy finds Bullwinkle and scans him into the White House's computer system, then e-mails him to the studio just as Fearless Leader addresses the nation, disrupting the broadcast, and a chaotic fight breaks out, leading to the capture of the villains. Karen, Rocky, and Bullwinkle then ask the American public to replant Frostbite Falls, and Bullwinkle accidentally activates the CDI, transforming the villains back to their animated forms and banishing them to the Internet once and for all.
 
In the aftermath, Rocky and Bullwinkle's careers are renewed in RBTV, renamed to "Rocky and Bullwinkle Television", and Karen goes on a date with Ole as Rocky, Bullwinkle, and the Narrator return home to a rejuvenated Frostbite Falls.

Cast

Production
In October 1998, it was announced Monica Potter had been cast as the lead. Robert De Niro was also announced to be in negotiations for the role of Fearless Leader, with Des McAnuff set to direct from Kenny Lonergan’s screenplay. In November 1998, Jason Alexander was cast as Boris Badenov. In January 1999, Rene Russo was cast as Natasha Fatale. In February 1999, Potter dropped out from the lead role and was replaced by Piper Perabo.

Reception

Box office
Rocky & Bullwinkle opened in 2,460 venues, earning $6,814,270 in its opening weekend and ranking fifth in the North American box office and third among the week's new releases. It closed on October 5, 2000 with a domestic total of $26,005,820 and $9,129,000 in other territories for a worldwide gross of $35,134,820, making it a box office bomb.

The failure of the film was attributed to the film not being fresh enough for young audiences or appealing to the nostalgia of Baby boomers.

Critical response
On Rotten Tomatoes, the film has an approval rating of 43% based on 100 reviews, with an average rating of 4.81/10. The critical consensus stated, "Though the film stays true to the nature of the original cartoon, the script is disappointing and not funny." On Metacritic the film has a score of 36 out of 100 based on reviews from 30 critics, indicating "generally unfavorable reviews". Audiences surveyed by CinemaScore gave the film a grade "B" on scale of A to F.

Roger Ebert of the Chicago Sun-Times gave it 3 out of 4 stars and wrote: "Has the same mixture of dumb puns, corny sight gags and sly, even sophisticated in-jokes. It's a lot of fun."

Accolades

Home media 
The Adventures of Rocky and Bullwinkle was released on VHS and DVD on February 13, 2001, and on Blu-ray on May 15, 2018.

See also 
 Mr. Peabody & Sherman

References

External links

 
 
 
 
 

The Adventures of Rocky and Bullwinkle and Friends
2000 films
2000 comedy films
2000s English-language films
2000 animated films
2000s comedy road movies
2000s adventure comedy films
2000s buddy comedy films
2000s fantasy comedy films
2000s American animated films
2000s children's animated films
American fantasy comedy films
American animated fantasy films
American animated comedy films
American adventure comedy films
American buddy comedy films
American fantasy adventure films
American comedy road movies
Films about the Federal Bureau of Investigation
Films scored by Mark Mothersbaugh
Films about shapeshifting
Films produced by Robert De Niro
Films set in 1964
Films set in 1999
Films set in Minnesota
Films set in New York City
American films with live action and animation
Live-action films based on animated series
Live-action films based on Jay Ward cartoons
Films with screenplays by Kenneth Lonergan
Metafictional works
Self-reflexive films
Universal Pictures animated films
Universal Pictures films
2000s fantasy adventure films